Tahir Maqsood (born 3 March 1981) is a Pakistani cricketer. He played in 50 first-class and 15 List A matches between 2001 and 2011.

References

External links
 

1981 births
Living people
Pakistani cricketers
Bahawalpur cricketers
Multan cricketers
Pakistan Customs cricketers
Sui Southern Gas Company cricketers
Khan Research Laboratories cricketers
Cricketers from Bahawalpur